Thomas Sheridan & Sons is the distillery, owned by the Gilbey's Group, which produces Baileys Irish Cream and Sheridan's Cream Liqueur (as well as other well-known liqueur products). Their address is located at T. Sheridan & Sons (Thomas Sheridan), Nangor Road, Dublin 12, Ireland.

The plant is not open to public visits, but private tours can be arranged by calling the plant's public relationship office well in advance.

Distilleries in the Republic of Ireland